Anzy-le-Duc is a commune in the Saône-et-Loire department in the region of Bourgogne-Franche-Comté in eastern France.

Geography
The commune lies in the southwest of the department in the valley of the Loire.

The village lies in the middle of the commune, above the left bank of the Arconce, which flows southwest through the eastern part of the commune, then north through its central part.

Population

See also
Communes of the Saône-et-Loire department

References

Communes of Saône-et-Loire